Smilepholcia is a genus of Lepidoptera in the family of owlet moths, also known as Noctuidae.

Species
Smilepholcia luteifascia Hampson, 1894

References

Pantheinae